Lambert Schill (July 7, 1888 – December 13, 1976) was a German politician of the Christian Democratic Union (CDU) and former member of the German Bundestag.

Life 
He had been a member of the German Bundestag since its first election from 1949 to 1957. As a directly elected member of parliament he represented the constituency of Lörrach.

Literature

References

1888 births
1976 deaths
Members of the Bundestag for Baden-Württemberg
Members of the Bundestag 1953–1957
Members of the Bundestag 1949–1953
Members of the Bundestag for the Christian Democratic Union of Germany
Knights Commander of the Order of Merit of the Federal Republic of Germany
Recipients of the Order of Merit of Baden-Württemberg